David Haydn Raven (born 10 March 1985) is an English former footballer and current assistant manager at Warrington Town. He played as a right-back or centre-back.

Career

Liverpool 
He initially started playing in Tranmere Rovers' academy while attending Calday Grange Grammar School before joining Liverpool.

Raven made his first team debut with a man-of-the-match display during the League Cup quarter-final win against Tottenham Hotspur at White Hart Lane in December 2004 and went on to play in two further games: disappointing defeats to Burnley in the FA Cup Third Round and Southampton in the Barclays Premiership. He had also played in the pre-season match against Wrexham in August 2004.

He featured in a number of games at centre-half for the reserves throughout 2004 but manager Rafael Benítez, having been impressed since his arrival in the summer, saw his best position as right-back. He became the regular captain of Liverpool's reserve team.
Raven spent the latter part of the 2005–06 season on loan at Tranmere Rovers.

Carlisle United 
Raven then moved to Carlisle United from Liverpool on a free transfer but his debut lasted only half-an-hour before he was substituted because of injury.

After an injury-plagued first season at Carlisle, 2007–08 was a different story for Raven, as he established himself as Carlisle's first choice right-back. He also won the club's 'Most Improved Player of the Year' award. During this season he also scored his first goal for Carlisle when he netted against Orient.

Raven signed for Shrewsbury Town in July 2010 on a one-year contract.

Shrewsbury Town 
Having been released from Carlisle United, new Shrewsbury Town manager Graham Turner announced Raven as his second permanent signing. After another injury plagued, yet consistent season when playing, Raven was released by the club in May 2011.

Tranmere Rovers 
In the summer of 2011, he returned to former 'loan' club Tranmere Rovers on trial, playing in a pre-season tie against Colwyn Bay. He signed for the club but was subsequently released at the end of the 2011–12 season after making 17 league appearances.

Inverness Caledonian Thistle 
He signed for SPL side Inverness Caledonian Thistle in June 2012. He made his debut in a 2–1 friendly win over Buckie Thistle. His SPL debut came against St Mirren in a 2–2 draw.

Raven scored his first goal for ICT when he opened the scoring in a 3–0 Highland derby win against Ross County in February 2014. His third career goal was an extra-time winner against Celtic, in the 2014–15 Scottish Cup semi-final at Hampden Park, Glasgow, on Sunday 19 April 2015. On 30 April Inverness CT announced that Raven had signed a one-year contract extension, keeping him at the club until the end of the 2015–16 season. Inverness won the 2014–15 Scottish Cup, but Raven missed the cup final due to injury.

Just before December 2017, David Raven confirmed that he would be leaving the club for greener pastures, due to the fact of the club being in debt and being unable to afford several high earning players' wages. Raven was one on the list that they couldn't afford. He also admitted that he wanted to start coaching with the highland club.

On 2 January 2018, Raven played his final home game for Inverness in a 1–1 draw with Livingston in the 2017–18 Scottish Championship. His final game for Caley Thistle came four days later in a 1–0 loss to St Mirren.

Wrexham
On 26 January 2018, Raven joined Wrexham and made his debut the following day in a 2–2 draw against former club Tranmere Rovers and alongside former Inverness teammate Scott Boden. Raven was released by Wrexham in May 2018.

Warrington Town 
On 1 July 2018, Raven joined Northern Premier League side, Warrington Town, after almost 2 months without a club. He made two appearances for the club in the FA Cup against Halifax Town in the initial 2–2 draw on 20 October 2018, and the 2–0 loss in the replay three days later.

Marine 
In September 2020 he joined Marine. He left in December 2021 to become assistant manager at Warrington Town.

Career statistics

References

External links 

1985 births
People from West Kirby
Living people
Association football defenders
English footballers
Tranmere Rovers F.C. players
Liverpool F.C. players
Carlisle United F.C. players
Shrewsbury Town F.C. players
Premier League players
English Football League players
England youth international footballers
People educated at Calday Grange Grammar School
Inverness Caledonian Thistle F.C. players
Wrexham A.F.C. players
Scottish Premier League players
Scottish Professional Football League players
Warrington Town F.C. players
Northern Premier League players
Marine F.C. players